The Football League of Europe (FLE) was a European American football league. It was founded in 1994, renamed 1995 in American Football League of Europe (AFLE) and dissolved after the 1995 season because of the ongoing financial problems. The trophy given annually to the FLE champions was the Jim Thorpe Trophy.

History
The league was founded in 1994 under the leadership of the German team Hamburg Blue Devils. 
The Blue Devils left the league after the 1994 FLE season going back to the well established German Football League for the 1995 season.
After the 1994 season, three other teams also left the league. The league folded following the 1995 season.

1994 season
Eight teams competed during the first season, in 1994.

North Conference
Berlin Bears 
Hamburg Blue Devils 
Helsinki Roosters 
Stockholm Nordic Vikings 

Central Conference
Amsterdam Crusaders 
Frankfurt Gamblers 
Great Britain Spartans
Munich Thunder 

The championship games was held in front of 18,000 spectators in Hamburg's Volksparkstadion. The Stockholm Nordic Vikings defeated the host Hamburg Blue Devils with 43:35.

1995 season
With the move of the Hamburg Blue Devils back into the German Football League after the 1994 season the league had lost their flagship team. Three other teams left the league now named American Football League of Europe.

Amsterdam Crusaders
Bergamo Lions
Frankfurt Knights
Great Britain Spartans
Stockholm Nordic Vikings

In the championship games the Stockholm Nordic Vikings beat the Bergamo Lions 14:0 to become 2 time champions.

References

Defunct American football leagues in Europe
Sports leagues established in 1994
Sports leagues disestablished in 1995
1994 establishments in Europe
1995 disestablishments in Europe